Training Command was the Royal Air Force's command responsible for flying and ground training from 1936 to 1940 and again from 1968 to 1977. Training Command was formed from RAF Inland Area on 1 May 1936 and absorbed into RAF Support Command on 13 June 1977. From 27 May 1940 to 1 June 1968, Training Command did not exist as its functions were split into Flying Training Command and Technical Training Command.

On initial formation or from 1936 the Command appears to have directed Nos 20, 21, 23, 24, and No. 26 Group RAF. 

No. 23 Group was transferred to Training Command on 1 May 1936.  It was then transferred again to Flying Training Command on 27 May 1940. It was reabsorbed into Training Command in 1968. After 1 January 1957, No. 23 Group was responsible for Nos 1 - 5, No. 6 (1957-68), No. 7 (from 1957-60) and No. 8 Flying Training School RAF (from 1957-64); it disbanded at RAF Linton-on-Ouse on 2 May 1975.

Air Officers Commanding-in-Chief
Air Officers Commanding-in-Chief included:

1936 to 1940
1 May 1936 Air Marshal Sir Charles Burnett
1 July 1939 Air Chief Marshal Sir Arthur Longmore

1968 to 1977
1 June 1968 Air Marshal Sir John Davis
1 April 1969 Air Marshal Sir Leslie Mavor
21 December 1972 Air Marshal Sir Neville Stack
31 January 1976 Air Marshal Sir Rex Roe

See also

 List of Royal Air Force commands

References

Further reading 
 96 pages. 
 il Flight Magazine 63: 688-689 My 29 '53

Flight training in the United Kingdom
Training units and formations of the Royal Air Force
Training Command
Military units and formations established in 1936
Military units and formations disestablished in 1977